Sibiryachikha is a rural locality (a selo) in Sibiryachikhinsky Selsoviet, Soloneshensky District, Altai Krai, Russia. The population was 709 as of 2013. There are 14 streets.

Geography 
Sibiryachikha is located 36 km northwest of Soloneshnoye (the district's administrative centre) by road. Sadovy is the nearest rural locality.

References 

Rural localities in Soloneshensky District